The German torpedo boat T4 was one of a dozen Type 35 torpedo boats built for the Kriegsmarine (German Navy) during the late 1930s. Completed during World War II in mid-1940, she participated in an abortive attempt to attack several convoys off the Scottish coast in November 1940. The boat was one of the escorts for several commerce raiders passing through the English Channel in 1941 and 1942 and helped to escort a pair of battleships and a heavy cruiser through the Channel back to Germany in the Channel Dash. She was assigned to the Torpedo School in mid-1943 and was then transferred to the Baltic Sea a year later. The boat was allocated to the United States after the war, but she was sold to Denmark a few years later. Unused by the Royal Danish Navy, T4 was scrapped in 1951–1952.

Design and description
The Type 35 was an unsuccessful attempt by the Kriegsmarine to design a fast, ocean-going torpedo boat that did not exceed the  displacement limit of the London Naval Treaty for ships that counted against the national tonnage limit. Their crew numbered 119 officers and sailors.

As built, the Type 35 class mounted a single  SK C/32 gun on the stern. Anti-aircraft defense was provided by a single  SK C/30 anti-aircraft gun superfiring over the 10.5 cm gun and a pair of  C/30 guns on the bridge wings. They carried six above-water  torpedo tubes in two triple mounts and could also carry 30 mines (or 60 if the weather was good). Many boats exchanged the 3.7 cm gun for another 2 cm gun, depth charges and minesweeping paravanes before completion. Late-war additions were limited to the installation of radar, radar detectors and additional AA guns, usually at the expense of the aft torpedo tube mount.

Construction and career
T4 was ordered on 16 November 1935 from Schichau, laid down at their  Elbing, East Prussia, shipyard on 29 December 1936 as yard number 1383, launched on 15 September 1938 and commissioned on 27 May 1940. The boat was working up until October when she was transferred to Norway for convoy escort duties. By November the 1st and 2nd Torpedo Boat Flotillas were based in Stavanger, Norway. German aerial reconnaissance had located two coastal convoys in early November that the Kriegsmarine estimated would pass Kinnaird Head, Scotland, during the early morning of 7 November. The British had extended their minefields further north unbeknownst to the Germans and T6 struck a mine shortly after midnight and sank. T7 and T8 rescued the survivors and the operation was abandoned. T4 began a refit in February 1941 that lasted until September when she was transferred to the West.

On 16 November, T4, T7 and their sister  departed Copenhagen, Denmark, en route to Cherbourg, France, to meet the commerce raider Komet. The torpedo boats arrived on the 25th and Komet reached Cherbourg the following day. The ships departed that night and arrived at Le Havre the following morning, where they waited for night to fall before proceeding. The British had spotted them and they were intercepted by motor torpedo boats (MTB) on the 28th between Boulogne and Dunkirk. Despite the attack, Komet reached the Atlantic. Later that day, they began to escort Thor through the Channel. Delayed by heavy fog, the ships did not reach Brest, France, until the 15th, while Thor continued onwards into the Atlantic.

As part of the preparations for the Channel Dash, the Kriegsmarine substituted a quadruple 2 cm mount for T4s aft torpedo tubes and added a 2 cm single mount at the bow to reinforce the boat's anti-aircraft suite. T4s torpedo tubes were replaced afterwards, although the quadruple mounting may have been moved to the aft superfiring position and she also may have kept her bow-chaser. On 20–22 July the 3rd Torpedo Boat Flotilla, consisting of T4, T10, T13 and T14, laid two minefields in the Channel. The flotilla, now consisting of T4, T10, T14 and  made an unsuccessful attempt to escort Komet through the Channel on 13–14 October. They were intercepted by a British force of five escort destroyers and eight MTBs that sank the raider and severely damaged T10. T4, on the other hand, was struck by stray machine-gun fire from Komet that wounded several men.

T4 began a refit at Wesermünde in January 1943 that lasted 11 May after which she was assigned to the Torpedo School. The boat was overhauled in March–June 1944 and was then transferred to the Baltic. At the end of the year, T4 was assigned to the 2nd Torpedo Boat Flotilla together with T1, T3 and T8. T4 was allocated to the United States when the Allies divided the surviving ships of the Kriegsmarine amongst themselves in late 1945. The United States Navy had no interest in her and she was sold to Denmark on 18 June 1948 for use as a MTB leader. Never commissioned by the Royal Danish Navy, the boat was demolished in 1950–1951.

Notes

References

External links
Type 35 on German Navy.de

Type 35 torpedo boats
1938 ships